Savur is a town and seat of the Savur District in the Mardin Province of Turkey.

The town is populated by Arabs, Assyrians and Kurds and had a population of 5,621 in 2021.

Politics 
In the local elections of March 2019, Gülistan Öncü of the pro-minority HDP was elected mayor. On 15 November 2019, she was detained due to an investigation related to terrorism. She was dismissed the following day, and District Governor Bayram Türker was appointed as a trustee.

Notable people 
Aziz Sancar, Turkish scientist of Arab origin and second Turkish nobel laureate

References

Populated places in Mardin Province
Tur Abdin
Assyrian communities in Turkey
Kurdish settlements in Mardin Province
Savur District
Arab settlements in Mardin Province